Katalin Anna Kulcsár (born 7 December 1984) is a Hungarian football referee. She refereed the final of the 2009 UEFA Women's Under-17 Championship.

She eventually reached the top division of male football in Hungary, the Nemzeti Bajnokság I, officiating a match between BFC Siófok and Honvéd in 2011. She was selected by FIFA for the 2015 FIFA Women's World Cup.

At the 2015 FIFA Women's World Cup, Kulcsár officiated the group-round match between New Zealand and China. The game ended in a 2–2 draw with China advanced to the knockout round.

Kulcsár was appointed to referee the 2016 UEFA Women's Champions League final at Stadio Città del Tricolore.

On 3 December 2018, Kulcsár was appointed to be a referee for the 2019 FIFA Women's World Cup in France. Kulcsár officiated the United States vs. Spain round of 16 match on 24 June 2019. After the conclusion of the round of 16, Kulcsár was selected as one of 11 officials to officiate matches for the remainder of the tournament.

References

External links

Profile at footballzz.com

Living people
1984 births
Hungarian football referees
Women association football referees
FIFA Women's World Cup referees